Avni Spahiu (born 12 March 1953 in Mitrovica, Kosovo) is a Kosovar diplomat and former television director. Spahiu currently serves as the Republic of Kosovo's ambassador to the Republic of Turkey. During 2008-2012 Spahiu served as Ambassador to the United States.

History
Avni Spahiu graduated from University of Pristina in 1986, with a degree in Literature. From 1999 to 2000, he was Editor in Chief of Radio Television of Kosovo (RTK). Then from 2002 till 2003, he was Director of RTK.

References

Living people
Kosovan diplomats
1953 births
University of Pristina alumni
Ambassadors of Kosovo to the United States
Ambassadors of Kosovo to Turkey
Kosovan journalists